Totally Spinning is an album by the Rova Saxophone Quartet recorded in 1996 for the Italian Black Saint label but not released until 2006.

Reception

The Allmusic review by Scott Yanow states "This is one of Rova's more accessible projects, although the music certainly has its adventurous and passionate moments. Recommended". On All About Jazz Jeff Stockton said it was "as approachable as Rova gets, an enjoyably listenable point of entry into the work of this groundbreaking veteran group".

Track listing
 "Let's Go Totally Spinning" (Jon Raskin) – 8:08
 "Stiction" (Steve Adams) – 6:35
 "Radar" (Raskin, Adams, Bruce Ackley, Larry Ochs) – 4:02
 "Cuernavaca Starlight" (Adams) – 7:54
 "Kick It" (Fred Frith) – 3:40
 "It's a Journey, Not a Destination" (Raskin) – 15:49
 "Preshrunk" (Adams) – 5:37
 "Radar (Version 731)" (Raskin, Adams, Ackley, Ochs) – 8:11
Recorded on April 14, 1996 at Sharkbite Studios, Oakland, CA (tracks 1 & 2) and November 18 & 19, 2000 at Mr. Toads, San Francisco, CA (tracks 3–8)

Personnel
Bruce Ackley – soprano saxophone
Steve Adams – alto saxophone, sopranino saxophone 
Larry Ochs – tenor saxophone, sopranino saxophone
Jon Raskin – baritone saxophone

References

Black Saint/Soul Note albums
Rova Saxophone Quartet albums
2006 albums